Generation Tesla (Serbian: Generacija Tesla) was a Serbian comic book about a superhero team of the same name, created by writer Milan Konjević and artists Siniša Radović and Zdravko Zupan. The series was started in 1995, and a total of eight issues were published before the comic was cancelled.

History
Generation Tesla was started in 1995, by the publisher Luxor Strip. The comic represented one of the biggest attempts to revive the comic scene in Serbia after the breakup of Yugoslavia. The stories were written by Milan Konjević, penciled by Siniša Radović and inked by Zdravko Zupan.

The first issues were publish together with another Luxor Strip comic, Borci sumraka (Twilight Fighters), and were later sold separately. A total of eight issues were published, until the comic was canceled due to distribution problems.

Characters

Nikola Tesla
Nikola Tesla, one of the greatest scientist in history, the founder of Generation Tesla, who has evaded his own death by transferring himself to another plane of existence. He resurrected a number of humans slain by the evil Kobalt, transforming them into super humans who could counter the threats of such villains.

Generation Tesla

Cybernaut
Cybernaut's real name is Peter Tešić. After him and his wife Barbra Ryan were murdered by Kobalt, they were resurrected by Nikola Tesla. Peter became a cyborg, able to fly and fire beams of energy from his wrist gauntlets. Parts of his body are protected by armor, and on his left shoulder he carries a large calibre weapon.

Saw
Saw's real name is Mladen Janković. He is a former circus performer. He is also a cyborg, able to transform his hands into chainsaw-like blades.

Solar
Solar's real name is Steve Ryan. He is Barbra Ryan's brother and Peter Tešić's (Cybernaut's) brother-in-law. Solar can fly and generate bolts of energy from his hands.

Portal
Portal's real name is Kolja Ivanović. Portal, was, like the other Generation Tesla members, resurrected by Nikola Tesla, but he uses gun as a weapon and it remains unclear what superpower if any he has.

Vincha
Vincha (her name referring to the Vincha culture) is an ancient warrior resurrected by Nikola Tesla.

Barbra
Barbra Ryan is a pilot, Peter Tešić's (Cybernaut's) wife and Steve Ryan's (Solar's) sister.

Misha
Misha is Portal's younger brother and a later addition to the team. He has the power to manipulate virtual reality.

Misha is the only Generation Tesla character to appear in Factor 4, a comic set in the same universe but 60 years into the future. In this comic Misha is an old man hooked up to a computer.

Marko Nemir
Doctor Marko Nemir ("nemir" means disturbance in Serbian) is an adventurer and an ally of Generation Tesla.

A special issue about Marko Nemir was almost finished but never released.

Kobalt
Kobalt is a supervillain, and Generation Tesla's main opponent.

References

External links
Generation Tesla on Internationalhero.co.uk

Serbian comics titles
Superhero comics
Serbian comics characters
Comics set in Serbia
Comics set in Belgrade
Fictional Serbian people
Works about Nikola Tesla
1995 comics debuts